Philip Vallance may refer to:

 Philip Vallance (cricketer, born 1803) (1803–1897), English cricketer
 Philip Vallance (cricketer, born 1761) (1761–?), English cricketer